Lucien Besnard (19 January 1872, Nonancourt – 1955) was a French playwright and drama critic. He held a doctorate in law and was graduated in Russian from the École des langues orientales.

The Académie Française awarded Lucien Besnard two prizes:

1926: the Prix Émile Augier for L’homme qui n’est plus de ce monde
1928: the Prix Toirac for Le cœur partagé

In 1932, he adapted in French The White Horse Inn, German operetta by Ralph Benatzky. 

Lucien Besnard is buried at Vaugirard Cemetery in Paris.

Main plays 
1896: Le Glas 
1898: Papa Dollivet 
1899: Les Chiens du maître 
1900: La Fronde 
1902: Le Domaine
1904: L'Affaire Grisel 
1906: La Plus Amoureuse 
1908: Mon ami Teddy 
1909: Le Diable ermite 
1910: La Folle enchère 
1913: Je veux revoir ma Normandie 
1924: L'homme qui n'est plus de ce monde
1926: Le Cœur partagé 
1927: Dans l'hombre du harem

External links 
 Lucien Besnard on data.bnf.fr

20th-century French dramatists and playwrights
People from Eure
1872 births
1955 deaths